Bead Wreck Site is located in the New Gretna section of Bass River Township, Burlington County, New Jersey, United States. The site was added to the National Register of Historic Places on October 18, 1988.

See also
National Register of Historic Places listings in Burlington County, New Jersey

References

Bass River Township, New Jersey
Geography of Burlington County, New Jersey
National Register of Historic Places in Burlington County, New Jersey
New Jersey Register of Historic Places